The 2022–23 season is the 141st season in the existence of Burnley and the club's first season back in the Championship since 2015–16, following its relegation from the Premier League last season. In addition to the league, the team will also compete in the FA Cup and the EFL Cup.

Transfers

In

Out

Loans in

Loans out

Pre-season and friendlies

On 24 June, Burnley announced their plans for their pre-season schedule.

Competitions

Overall record

Championship

League table

Results summary

Results by round

Matches

On 23 June, the league fixtures were announced.

FA Cup

The Clarets were drawn away to Bournemouth in the third round and to Ipswich Town in the fourth round.

EFL Cup

Burnley entered the competition in the second round and were drawn away to Shrewsbury Town. In the fourth round, a trip to face Manchester United was drawn out.

Appearances and goals
Source:
Numbers in parentheses denote appearances as substitute.
Players with names struck through and marked  left the club during the playing season.
Players with names in italics and marked * were on loan from another club for the whole of their season with Burnley.
Players listed with no appearances have been in the matchday squad but only as unused substitutes.
Key to positions: GK – Goalkeeper; DF – Defender; MF – Midfielder; FW – Forward

See also
 2022–23 in English football
 List of Burnley F.C. seasons

References

Burnley F.C. seasons
Burnley F.C.
English football clubs 2022–23 season